Mat bez elektrichestva (where Russian word 'mat' referred to Russian mat and Checkmate) is second studio album of the Russian band Leningrad and their first album to have Sergei Shnurov as lead vocalist.

Track listing
"Французская помада" - Frantsuzskaya pomada (French Lipstick) – 2:11
"Я – твой ковбой" - Ya – tvoy kovboy (I am Your Cowboy) – 2:16
"Звезда рок-н-ролла" - Zvezda rok-n-rolla (Rock'n'Roll Star) – 2:09
"Батарея" - Batareya (Radiator) – 2:26
"Дикий мужчина" - Dikiy muzhchina (Wild Dude) – 2:37 
"Алкоголик" - Alkogolik (Alcoholic) – 2:08
"Маленький мальчик" - Malenkiy malchik (Little Boy) – 3:16 
"Только с тобой" -  (Only with You) – 3:11
"Шоу-бизнес" - Shou-biznes (Show Business) – 3:24
"Будем веселиться" - Budem veselitsya (We Will Party) – 1:12
 "Do You Love Me" (Дай любви) – 2:46
"Страдаю" - Stradayu (I Suffer) – 2:16
"Давай джазу" - Davay dzhazu (Give Me Jazz) – 2:09
"Bonus" – 2:54

External links
Album available for download from the official Leningrad website

1999 albums
Leningrad (band) albums